The 1576 siege of Mitsuji was part of the eleven-year Ishiyama Hongan-ji War. The Ikkō-ikki, a group of warrior monks and peasants, controlled the fortress and stood as one of the primary obstacles to Oda Nobunaga's bid for power.

In May 1576, Nobunaga personally took part in an attack on the fortress. He led a number of ashigaru (foot soldiers) in pushing back the Ikki garrison to their inner gates. Nobunaga suffered a bullet wound to his leg.

He also lost one of his generals, Harada Naomasa.

References

Battles of the Sengoku period
Sieges involving Japan
1576 in Japan
Conflicts in 1576